Then and Again is the fourth studio album by Cuban American dark cabaret singer Voltaire, released on October 26, 2004, through Projekt Records. Contrasting with most of Voltaire's albums, on which his songs are mostly humorous and satirical, Then and Again features more serious and introspective songs, dealing about love, heartbreak and the human condition.

"Goodnight Demonslayer" is a lullaby composed by Voltaire for his son Mars, then an infant.

"Lovesong" is a cover of The Cure.

The song "Halló elskan mín" is partially sung in Icelandic. It is an homage to one of Voltaire's ex-girlfriends, who hails from Iceland.

Donna Lynch and Steven Archer of Ego Likeness provide additional vocals for the tracks "Believe" and "Wall of Pride". Archer also plays the electric guitar.

Track listing

Personnel
 Voltaire — vocals, acoustic guitar
 Gregor Kitzis — violin
 Matthew Goeke — cello
 George Grant — bass
 Stephen Moses — drums
 Steven Archer — electric guitar

Guest vocals were provided by Ego Likeness. They would work with Voltaire again in his 2014 album Raised by Bats.

References

External links
 Voltaire's official website
 Then and Again on Projekt Records' official website

2004 albums
Voltaire (musician) albums
Projekt Records albums